The Netherlands women's national under-23 volleyball team represents Netherlands in international women's volleyball competitions and friendly matches under the age 23 and it is ruled by the Dutch Volley Association That is an affiliate of International Volleyball Federation FIVB and also a part of European Volleyball Confederation CEV.

Results

FIVB U23 World Championship
 Champions   Runners up   Third place   Fourth place

Team

Current squad
The following is the Dutch roster under-20 team that also represent The Netherlands in Under-23 Events.

Head coach:  Julien Van De Vyver

References

External links
Official website 

National women's under-23 volleyball teams
Volleyball
Volleyball in the Netherlands